The 2015 1. deild karla (English: Men's First Division) was the 61st season of second-tier Icelandic football. Twelve teams contested the league which began on 8 May and concluded on 19 September.

Teams
The league was contested by twelve clubs. Eight remained in the division from the 2014 season, while four new clubs joined the 1. deild karla:
 Fram and Þór were relegated from the 2014 Úrvalsdeild, replacing Leiknir R. and ÍA who were promoted to the 2015 Úrvalsdeild.
 Fjarðabyggð and Grótta were promoted from the 2014 2. deild karla, in place of KV and Tindastóll who were relegated to the 2015 2. deild karla.

Club information

League table

Results grid
Each team plays every opponent once home and away for a total of 22 matches per club; 132 matches altogether.

Top goalscorers

References

1. deild karla (football) seasons
Iceland
Iceland
2